Lake Shore Drive is the third album by Chicago-based rock group Aliotta Haynes Jeremiah, released in 1973 on the Big Foot Records label.

The title track of the same name pays homage to the Chicago boulevard Lake Shore Drive, which extends along Lake Michigan north and south of the downtown area of Chicago for approximately 16 miles. Outside of the Chicago area, the song was generally interpreted as a reference to the drug LSD.

Track listing 
Side A
 "Lake Shore Drive" (3:50)
 "For Eddy" (3:39)
 "Long Time Gone" (5:46)
 "Uppers and Downers" (3:14)
Side B
 "Snow Queen" (4:28)
 "Leaving Chicago A.M.F." (5:54)
 "One Night Stand" (3:30)
 "Last of Night People" (3:45)

1971 albums
Aliotta Haynes Jeremiah albums